Frognal may refer to: 

 Frognal, an area of Hampstead, north-west London, England, and a road from Finchley Road to Hampstead
 Finchley Road & Frognal railway station
 Frognal (ward)
 Frognal and Fitzjohns (ward)
 Frognal, Bexley, archaic place name located between Sidcup and Chislehurst in southeast London, England
 Frognal House, a Jacobean mansion in southeast London, England
 Frognal, South Ayrshire, a location in South Ayrshire, Scotland
 Duke of Frognal, a fictional character in the 1954 film The Million Pound Note

See also

Frognall, a village in Lincolnshire, England
Frognall, Melbourne, a house in Australia